Chika 'Nancy' Ike  (born 8 November 1985) is a Nigerian actress, television personality, producer, business woman, philanthropist and former model.

Early life
Born in Onitsha, Anambra state of Nigeria. She began acting in church plays at the age of six. Ike began her career as a model at age 16 just after finishing secondary school. In 2004, Ike completed a two-year diploma programme in Human Kinetics and Health Education before earning her degree in the same course, both from University of Lagos. In 2014, she graduated from the New York Film Academy in Los Angeles where she studied Film Making.

Career

Film and television
Ike began her film career in 2005 when she played a minor character in the movie Sweet Love. She got her first major role that same year in a movie titled Bless the Child and has since played major roles in over a hundred movies, such as Paradise, Mirror of Beauty, To Love a Stranger, Girls Got Reloaded, Happy Ending, Yes We Will, Anointed Queen and The Prince and the Princess.

In 2007, Mirror of Beauty was shown in Cineworld and Odeon cinemas across the U.K and in 2008 It was selected and screened at the Cannes film festival.

She founded her production company, Chika Ike Production, in 2014, and produced her first movie Miss Teacher and her reality TV game show African Diva Reality TV Show of which she is the executive producer, host and a member of the judging panel.
The first season aired on DStv and the second season aired on AIT. In 2015, she collaborated with Rok Studios to produce movies like Happy Ending and Stuck on You.

Other projects

Education
In 2004, Ike enrolled in the University of Lagos (Unilag) for a 2-year diploma program in human kinetics and health education. She completed the program in 2006, earning a certificate. She went further to get a degree in human kinetics and health education at Unilag. In 2014, she graduated from the New York Film Academy in Los Angeles, California where she studied film-making.

Philanthropy
Ike established the foundation Help the Child which is aimed at helping poor children. In 2012 she threw a street party where she hosted over 3000 children, feeding them and giving out toys, school bags and writing materials. Every year she organizes a major charity event for the children on the street, provides scholarships, and provides them with school writing materials.

Fashion line
In 2011, Ike founded her fashion line Fancy Nancy and launched it in Abuja, Nigeria.

Personal life
Ike has been outspoken on abusive relationships, having been a victim of domestic violence. In 2013, she opened up about how she was domestically abused in her past marriage. She filed for divorce due to domestic violence in 2013. She eventually announced through her Facebook page that she's "officially divorced". This however did not go down well with some fane as they rained abuses on her.

Awards and nominations
Ike has received several awards and nominations for her work, including the Africa Movie Academy Awards Best Upcoming Actress, 2008, and the Africa Movie Academy Award for Best Actress in a Supporting Role in 2009 for her performance in the movie "The Assassin".

Filmography

References

External links
 
 

1985 births
Living people
21st-century Nigerian actresses
Actresses from Onitsha
University of Lagos alumni
Actresses from Anambra State
Nigerian television personalities
Nigerian film producers
Nigerian female models
Nigerian philanthropists
New York Film Academy alumni
Igbo actresses
Nigerian humanitarians
Nigerian women film producers
Nigerian businesspeople
Nigerian women in business
Nigerian chief executives
Nigerian television producers